Hillend is a small village in Fife, Scotland. It is located roughly to the north-west of Dalgety Bay. It is the location of Heil's manufacturing facilities in the UK.

Villages in Fife
Dalgety Bay